Tambun Station (TB) is a class III railway station located in Mekarsari, South Tambun, Bekasi Regency. The station, which is located at an altitude of +19 meters, is included in the Operation Area I Jakarta. This station has four railway tracks with track 2 and 3 as straight lines.

Nearby the station is historic Gedung Juang Tambun building, a former landlord house during colonial era that currently houses Museum Bekasi.

Building and layout 
The old station building with cultural heritage status is closely related to the Gedung Juang Tambun building, which has the same status. During the war for independence, the Gedung Juang Tambun was used as a place for negotiations on the exchange of prisoners of war. When the captured Indonesian freedom fighters were returned to Indonesian territory via Bekasi, the Dutch soldiers who were caught were returned to the Netherlands by the Indonesian freedom fighters to Batavia by train through the old station building where the tracks were right behind the building. The station is on the south side adjacent to the building.

This station has now been replaced by a new building with a minimalist modern architecture which is also applied to stations on the planned Manggarai–Cikarang quadruple-track railway (doubled‐double track (DDT)). But unfortunately, when it was built, the old station building had already been torn down so that train passengers had complained about being too hot or caught in the rain while waiting for the train to arrive. At that time, the KRL Commuterline trips had been extended to Cikarang Station. Currently, some of the new station platforms can be used even though the new main building is still under construction.

Services
The following is a list of train services at the Tambun Station.

Passenger services 
 KAI Commuter
  Cikarang Loop Line (Full Racket)
  Cikarang Loop Line (Half Racket), to / (via  and ) and

Incidents 

 On 12 August 2008 at 07.31 WIB, Local Train 681 for the Karawang-Jakarta Kota route derailed on line 4. There were no casualties in this incident.
 On 21 June 2022, at 10:55 WIB, The Argo Sindoro train (with train number KA 11) collided with Toyota Avanza on the Walet level crossing. Unfortunately, the car was dragged up to about 1.2 km before entering the Tambun Station, so the driver died.

References

External links
 

Bekasi Regency
Railway stations in West Java
Railway stations opened in 1898
1890s establishments in the Dutch East Indies